The Golden Grand Prix Ivan Yarygin 2015 was held in Krasnoyarsk, Russia between 22 and 26 January 2015. Also known as Ivan Yarygin international

This international tournament included competition in both Freestyle wrestling. This Grand Prix is held in honor of 2-time Olympic Champion Ivan Yarygin.

Medal overview

Medal table

Men's freestyle

Women's freestyle

Participating nations
204 competitors from 17 (without ethnics & Islamics republics) nations participated.

 (16)
 (1)
 (6)
 (1)
 (1)
 (3)
 (3)
 (15)
 (42)
 (3)
 (1)
 (47)
 (51) (without ethnics & Islamic republics)
 (2)
 (2)
 (8)
 (2)

References

External links 
 http://unitedworldwrestling.org/event/ivan-yariguin-senior-1
 http://www.wrestrus.ru/turnirs/178 

Golden Grand Prix Ivan Yarygin
Golden Grand Prix Ivan Yarygin
2015 in sport wrestling